The 2015 WPA World Nine-ball Championship was the 24th edition of the 9-Ball pool World Championships. It took place from September 7 to 18, 2015 in the al-Attiya Sports Arena of the Al-Arabi Sports Club in Doha. The Qatari capital was the sixth time in a row the venue for the 9-Ball Championships.

The event was won by Ko Pin-yi of Chinese Taipei, who defeated America's Shane Van Boening in the final, with a score of 13 racks to 11.

Niels Feijen was the defending champion, however, he did not make it past the preliminary round of the tournament.

Format
From September 7 to 10, a qualifying tournament took place in which 128 participants played in three knockout competitions, for twelve starting places. The remaining 116 starting positions were previously awarded via the world rankings or according to a quota from the continental federations, the Qatari federation and as wildcard places by the WPA.

The 128 qualified for the main tournament players were initially divided into 16 groups. From September 12 to 15 these groups played in a double elimination tournament. From each group four players qualified for the final round, which took place from September 16 to 18 and was played in a knockout system. The event was played with the alternating break format. The goal was to play seven games in qualifying, nine games in the preliminary round, eleven games in the final round and 13 games in the final.

Prize money

Preliminary round

Group 1

Group 2

Group 3

Group 4

Group 5

Group 6

Group 7

Group 8

Group 9

Group 10

Group 11

Group 12

Group 13

Group 14

Group 15

Group 16

Knockout round

References

External links 
 WPA 9-Ball Championship 2015 from the World Pool-Billiard Association
 WPA World 9-Ball Championship 2015 at azbilliards.com

2015
WPA World Nine-ball Championship
WPA World Nine-ball Championship
International sports competitions hosted by Qatar
Sports competitions in Doha